Beaux Arts, Beaux arts, or Beaux-Arts is a French term corresponding to fine arts in English.  Capitalized, it may refer to:

 Académie des Beaux-Arts, a French arts institution (not a school)
 Académie Royale des Beaux-Arts, a Belgian arts school
 Beaux-Arts architecture, an architectural style
 Beaux Arts Gallery, an important gallery of British modern art
 Beaux-Arts Institute of Design a.k.a. BAID, New York City based art and architecture school
 Beaux Arts Magazine, French magazine
 Beaux Arts Trio, a classical music chamber group
 Beaux Arts Village, Washington, a small town in the Seattle metropolitan area
 École des Beaux-Arts, several art schools in France
 École nationale des beaux-arts de Lyon
 École nationale supérieure des Beaux-Arts, Paris
 Fine art, a style of painting popular at the turn of the 19th and 20th century, the source of the generalized concept of "fine arts", i.e. art for art's sake
 Palais des Beaux Arts, a federal cultural venue in Brussels, Belgium

See also
 Musée des Beaux Arts (disambiguation)